Julie Dorf (born February 28, 1965) is an international human rights advocate best known as the founding executive director of OutRight Action International (then known as the International Gay and Lesbian Human Rights Commission).<ref>Julie Dorf, Senior Advisor, Council for Global Equality". Retrieved June 3, 2017.</ref> She started the organization in 1990 and served as executive director until 2000.

Career
As scholar Ryan Thoreson describes in his book Transnational LGBT Activism'', Dorf "built the organization from a grassroots group in the style of ACT-UP or Queer Nation into a more professional 501(c)(3) that became an authoritative source for information about LGBT rights globally."

Dorf was subsequently on staff at the Horizons Foundation, a San Francisco Bay Area LGBT philanthropic organization before becoming a senior advisor at the Council for Global Equality, an organization she helped create and which advocates for LGBT-inclusive American foreign policy.

A leader in the movement toward international LGBT equality for many decades, a few of Dorf's other activities include: co-founding the Pink Triangle Coalition on reparations for homosexual victims of Nazi persecution; helping to establish the Astraea International Fund for Sexual Minorities; and implementing the Russia Freedom Fund to assist LGBT activists in the former Soviet Union battling anti-gay laws. Over the years she has served as an independent consultant for the World Professional Association for Transgender Health (WPATH), Open Society Institute, Global Fund for Women, Arcus Foundation, and Fenton Communications/J-Street Project. Julie currently serves on the board of directors of PowerPAC+; on the advisory boards of OutRight Action International and the LGBT Rights Program at Human Rights Watch; as well as on the Northern California Finance Committee of J-Street. Previously she served on the boards of the Bay Area Council for Soviet Jews (then known as the Bay Area Council for Jewish Rescue and Renewal), the Intersex Society of North America (ISNA) and Freedom to Marry.

Dorf is a Wesleyan University alumni with a B.A. in Russian and Soviet Studies.

References

1965 births
Living people
Activists from the San Francisco Bay Area
American human rights activists
Wesleyan University alumni
People from Milwaukee
American LGBT rights activists
Women civil rights activists